Zenkovka is a rural locality (a selo) in Zenkovsky Selsoviet of Konstantinovsky District, Amur Oblast, Russia. The population was 438 as of 2018. There are 6 streets.

Geography 
Zenkovka is located 56 km northeast of Konstantinovka (the district's administrative centre) by road. Zolotonozhka is the nearest rural locality.

References 

Rural localities in Konstantinovsky District